Would You Marry Me? (Spanish:Quiere casarse conmigo...?!) is a 1967 Argentine-Spanish musical comedy film directed by Enrique Carreras and starring Palito Ortega, Sonia Bruno and Eddie Pequenino. The film's art direction was by Gori Muñoz.

Cast

References

Bibliography 
 Peter Cowie & Derek Elley. World Filmography: 1967. Fairleigh Dickinson University Press, 1977.

External links 
 

1967 films
1967 musical comedy films
Spanish musical comedy films
Argentine musical comedy films
1960s Spanish-language films
1960s Argentine films
Films directed by Enrique Carreras